Syzygium hemisphericum is a flowering plant species in the family Myrtaceae, commonly called the hemispheric rose-apple. It is also known as teal-naval, vellanara, vellai-naval, goljamb, vennaval, redi jambul, makki nerale, payanjaval, vennjara, vellanjara, ven-nyara, venjara, tholnjaval, venyara and kaadu pannerale. This plant grows in abundance in the Western Ghats of India. It is also found in South and Central Maharashtra, Sahyadris, and Sri Lanka. It prefers evergreen and shola forests.

Description 
Its bark is smooth, greyish brown, and blaze cream in colour. Branches and branchlets are terete, and glabrous. Leaves  are simple, opposite, and decussate. Stigma is slightly acute. Fruits are a purple berry crowned by calyx lobes. Flowering and fruiting season is from March to June.

Uses 
It is used in folk medicine.

Gallery

References 

hemisphericum